The women's 10 metre platform, also reported as plongeons de haut vol ordinaires (English: regular high diving), was one of five diving events on the diving at the 1924 Summer Olympics programme. It was actually held from both 10 metre and 5 metre platforms. The competitors performed four compulsory dives. The competition was held on Saturday 19 July 1924, and Sunday 20 July 1924. Eleven divers from six nations competed.

Results

First round

The three divers who scored the smallest number of points in each group of the first round advanced to the final.

Group 1

Group 2

Final

References

External links
 
 

Women
1924
1924 in women's diving
Div